Özlüce Dam is a rock-fill embankment dam on the Peri River (a tributary of the Euphrates), located  south of Yayladere in Bingöl Province, Turkey. Its primary purpose is hydroelectric power generation and is the third dam in the Peri River cascade. Constructed between 1992 and 2000, the development was backed by the Turkish State Hydraulic Works.

See also

Pembelik Dam – downstream
Yedisu Dam – upstream
List of dams and reservoirs in Turkey

References

Dams in Bingöl Province
Rock-filled dams
Hydroelectric power stations in Turkey
Dams on the Peri River
Dams completed in 2000
Energy infrastructure completed in 2000